Jalkapalloseura Airport City (abbreviated AC Vantaa) is a football club from Vantaa in Finland. The club was formed in 1998 and their home ground is at ISS Stadion in Myyrmäki, Vantaa.  The men's first team currently plays in the Kakkonen (Second Division).  The Chairman of AC Vantaa is Pasi Kujala.

Background

The club was founded in 1998 as a flagship club for Vantaa following the merger of Tikkurilan Palloseura and Vantaan Jalkapalloseura men's first teams with assistance from Koivukylän Palloseura, Pallokerho-50 and Itä-Vantaan Urheilijat clubs.

AC Vantaa played two seasons in the Ykkönen (First Division), the second tier of Finnish football in 1999 and 2001.  They also have had three spells in the third tier, the Kakkonen (Second Division), in 2000, 2002–03 and now again in 2010.

In 2003 the club were relegated to the Kolmonen (Third Division) and were in danger of folding but were re-energised by a new Committee whose hard work was eventually rewarded by promotion back to the Kakkonen at the end of the 2009 season as champions of Section 2 of the Kolmonen.

Season to season

Club structure

Jalkapalloseura Airport City run a number of teams including 3 men's teams, 1 ladies team and 1 boys team.

2010 season

 AC Vantaa Men's Team are competing in Group A (Lohko A) of the Kakkonen administered by the Football Association of Finland (Suomen Palloliitto).  This is the third highest tier in the Finnish football system.  In 2009 AC Vantaa finished in first position in Section 2 of the Kolmonen and were promoted to the Kakkonen.

 AC Vantaa / 2 are participating in Section 3 (Lohko 3) of the Vitonen administered by the Uusimaa SPL.

References

External links
Official Website
Finnish Wikipedia
 Suomen Cup
 AC Vantaa Facebook

Football clubs in Finland
Sport in Vantaa
1998 establishments in Finland